River otter may refer to:

Otters
Eurasian river otter, found in Eurasia
Giant river otter, found in South America
Japanese river otter, an extinct species
Neotropical river otter, found in Central and South America
North American river otter, found in North America
Southern river otter, found in Chile and Argentina

Other uses
River Otter, Devon, a river in South West England
Missouri River Otters, a former minor league hockey team from St. Charles, Missouri

See also
Otter (disambiguation)
Otter River (disambiguation)
River Ottery, Cornwall

Animal common name disambiguation pages